Walter William Brabazon Ponsonby, 7th Earl of Bessborough (13 August 1821 – 24 February 1906), was a British peer and member of the House of Lords. He was the fifth son of John Ponsonby, 4th Earl of Bessborough, and his wife Lady Maria Fane. He inherited the earldom on 11 March 1895 when his elder brother Frederick Ponsonby, 6th Earl of Bessborough, died unmarried and without a male heir.

Education and career
He was educated at Harrow School and Trinity College, Cambridge. Between 1846 and 1894 he acted as Rector for the parishes of Canford Magna, Wiltshire; Beer Ferris, Devon; Marston Bigot, Somerset; and Stutton, Suffolk.

Family
On 15 January 1850 he married Lady Louisa Susan Cornwallis Eliot, daughter of Edward Granville Eliot, 3rd Earl of St Germans, and his wife Lady Jemima Cornwallis. Together they had eight children:

Edward Ponsonby, 8th Earl of Bessborough (born 1 March 1851, died 1 December 1920)
Maria Ponsonby (born c1852, died 19 November 1949)
Cyril Walter Ponsonby (born 8 September 1853, died 29 November 1927) - married Emily H Eyre Addington
Granville Ponsonby (born 13 September 1854, died 24 February 1924) - married Mabel Jackson
Arthur Cornwallis Ponsonby (born 8 January 1856, died 25 April 1918) - married Kathleen Eva Sillery
Ethel Jemima Ponsonby (born 8 April 1857, died 22 June 1940) - married George Somerset, 3rd Baron Raglan
Walter Gerald Ponsonby (born 31 July 1859, died 28 April 1934)
Sara Kathleen Ponsonby (died 10 June 1936) - married Maj. Charles Lancelot Andrews Skinner

References

thepeerage.com
Cracroft's Peerage

External links

1821 births
1906 deaths
People educated at Harrow School
Alumni of Trinity College, Cambridge
Ordained peers
Walter